The University of Birmingham Financial Forum is a student-run conference for hundreds of students that was founded in 2011 and held at the University of Birmingham, United Kingdom.

Format

The University of Birmingham Financial Forum is a day long conference structured around 45 minute keynote presentations and hour-long panel-based discussions.

At the conclusion of the event there is a networking session between the speakers, sponsors and delegates so that like-minded people may meet.

Past Forums

2014

Held on Friday 14 November, the fourth University of Birmingham Financial Forum was opened with an address from Mrs Gill Ball OBE, the Director of Finance at the University of Birmingham. This year's event reflected on the history of the financial sector and looked forward to what is of the future. As with previous years, the 2014 Financial Forum was held in the University of Birmingham's prestigious Great Hall, located right at the heart of campus, a venue which played host to the 3rd Prime Ministerial debate of the 2010 general election.

Speakers at the 2014 conference included:

 Patrice Muller, Senior Partner, London Economics - "Application of findings from behavioral economics to assess consumer detriment in financial markets".
 Pete Gladwell, Head of Public Sector Partnerships, Legal & General - "Investing Society's capital to address long term social need".
 Graham Wrigley, Chairman, CDC Group - "Sustainability – from Private Equity to Development Finance".
 Charlotte Conlan, Head of Loan Origination, BNP Paribas - "The Syndicated Loan Market".
 Lucy Baldwin, Managing Director, Goldman Sachs - "A structure for long-term investing and the future of the European corporate sector".
 Rob Mutchell, CFO, BP Ventures - "Energy, the Environment and the Economy – Panel Discussion".
 Mike Madden, Managing Director, MJM energy - "Energy, the Environment and the Economy – Panel Discussion".
 Tony Ward, Partner and Head of Power and Utilities UK&I, Ernst & Young - "Energy, the Environment and the Economy – Panel Discussion".

2013

Held on 18 October, the third University of Birmingham Financial Forum was again opened with an address from Professor David Eastwood, Vice Chancellor of the University of Birmingham. Students attended to listen to a range of topics focusing on current topical issues and particular areas of finance relevant to the speakers. Additionally, the conference diversified to cater to a wider range of students.

Speakers at the 2013 conference included:

 George Buckley, Chief UK Economist, Deutsche Bank - "The UK Economy: The Long Road to Recovery".
 Michael Rawlinson, Head of Metals and Mining, Barclays Investment Bank - "Raising Equity in the UK: A Twenty Year Perspective".
 Dane Douetil CBE, CEO, BMS Group - "The 10 Most Important Things I Have Learned (and Often Relearned) in Building Successful Companies in Both Public and Private Ownership".
 Tim Howells, CEO, Euroclear - "Financial Infrastructure - As Dull As It Sounds?".
 Stephen Denyer, Global Markets Partner, Allen & Overy - "Europe's Future Place in the World: A Perspective from a London Based Global Professional Services Firm".
 Professor Tim Congdon CBE, Economist and Businessman - "Monetary Policy" panel discussion.
 Professor Peter Sinclair, Emeritus Professor of Economics, University of Birmingham - "Monetary Policy" panel discussion.

2012

Held on 2 November, the second University of Birmingham Financial Forum was opened with an address from David Eastwood, Vice Chancellor of the University of Birmingham. Over 270 students were attracted to the conference to listen to a range of speakers discuss topics surrounding the central theme of "A Changing World". The theme looked at how the financial world was changing in all regions of the globe, from the restraint of financial institutions in the west, to the growing dominance of China and East Asian countries as a hub for finance, and the continuous turmoil in Europe.

Speakers at the 2012 conference included:

 Martin Slumbers, Global Head of Business Services, Deutsche Bank - "Global Banking: Evolution through a Changing Environment".
 Jeavon Lolay, Head of Global Research, Lloyds Banking Group - "The Global Implications of the Eurocrisis" panel discussion.
 Charlie Diebel, Head of Market Strategy, Lloyds Banking Group - "What to Trade and How to Profit in a Changed Post-Crisis World".
 John Zhu, UK Economist, HSBC Global Banking and Markets - "The Global Implications of the Eurocrisis" panel discussion.
 Philip Coggan, Buttonwood Columnist, The Economist, and ex-Investment Editor of the Financial Times - "Paper Promises: Money, Debt and the New World Order".
 Yogi Dewan, CEO, Hassium Asset Management - "Financial Markets from the Eyes of the Wealthy".
 Zahid Ali, Founder/Director, Octopus Asset Management - "A Changing World".
 Professor Alessandra Guariglia, Head of the Economics Department, University of Birmingham - "The Global Implications of the Eurocrisis" panel discussion.

2011

The first University of Birmingham Financial Forum was held on 22 October 2011. Held in the Great Hall, venue for the 3rd Prime Ministerial Debate, the Forum attracted 240 students from around the country with over 200 from the University of Birmingham and around 30 from universities around the country.

The theme, "Britain: The Open Economy", looked at Britain’s role in the global economy, and how governance and changing trade patterns are causing this role to change. The theme was chosen to provide students with an opportunity to broaden their ideas and common perceptions about Britain’s economy.

The event was supported by the University of Birmingham Economics Department, the University of Birmingham Economics Society  and the University of Birmingham Investment Society.

Speakers at the 2011 conference included:

 Muzaffar Khan, Principal and Board Member, Space Energy AG and author of Racing Towards Excellence - "The International Financial Market Place".
 Professor Cillian Ryan, Jean Monnet Chair of European Economics, Head of Education, Department of Social Sciences, University of Birmingham - "Have We Got the Right Solution to the Current Global Crisis?". 
 Mike Haywood, Independent Financial Advisor - "Britain and the World Debt Crisis".
 Chris Pierce, CEO, Global Governance Services Ltd. - "Corporate Governance in the UK: Heaven or Hell?".
 Dr Paul Lewis, University of Birmingham - "Moral Hazard in the Banking Sector" panel discussion.
 Elias Elias, Equity Specialist, Bloomberg - "Moral Hazard in the Banking Sector" panel discussion.
 Kim Kaivanto, Deputy Director of Money, Banking and Finance, Lancaster University - "Moral Hazard in the Banking Sector" panel discussion.
 Paul Heaven, Director, Blue Sky Corporate Finance - "Moral Hazard in the Banking Sector" panel discussion.
 John Hemming MP, Liberal Democrat Member of Parliament for Birmingham Yardley - "The Limits of UK Growth".
 Mark Drugan, Managing Director, Capital Dynamics Asset Management - "Investing in the UK" panel discussion.
 Claudio Giordani, Capital Structure Group, Bloomberg - "Investing in the UK" panel discussion.
 Mark Asplin, CEO, Jasper Corporate Finance - "Investing in the UK" panel discussion.

References

External links

 
 University of Birmingham, Economics Department
 University of Birmingham

Economics